Elections to the Corporation of the City of Glasgow were held on Tuesday 3 November 1896, alongside municipal elections across Scotland, and the wider British local elections.

The usual process was for one third of the councillors to be re-elected annually, however Glasgow had seen boundary extensions and had transformed from a Town Council to a City Corporation, and as such the election saw all 75 councillors from all 25 wards (3 councillors per ward) seeking re-election simultaneously. This was the first time since 3 November 1846 that all of Glasgow's councillors had been up for re-election simultaneously. The 1846 re-election had occurred as a result of the towns of Calton, Anderston, and the Gorbals being subsumed into Glasgow.

The election saw a group of social and civic reformers known as the Progressive Union emerge as the largest group on the council. The Progressive's had been inspired by the London-based Progressive Party, although Glasgow's Progressive platform had a more evangelical religious focus, combined with a belief in temperance, observance of the sabbath, and good municipal governance.

Contests took place in 23 of the cities 25 wards, with only the wards of Kingston and Sandyford going uncontested. Overall 114 candidates contested the 75 seats. The election saw an unusually heavy turnout, with female voters in particular voting in unprecedented numbers. This was credited to the efforts and influence of the new Progressive Union grouping.

The election was also the first to be contested by the Workers Municipal Elections Committee, which had been set up in June 1896 and comprised the Irish National League, the Independent Labour Party, and the Co-operative movement. This grouping was brought together under the leadership of John Ferguson (elected for Calton ward), a prominent Irish Home Rule activist with close contacts to both the Labour movement and radical politics.

Aggregate results

Wards

Anderston

Blackfriars

Blythswood

Broomielaw

Calton

Cowcaddens

Cowlairs

Darlmarnock

Dennistoun

Exchange

Gorbals

Govanhill

Hutchesontown

Kelvinside

Kingston

Langside

Maryhill

Mile-end

Park

Pollokshields

Sandyford

Springburn

Townhead

Whitevale

Woodside

Notes
 Thomson, Finlay, Morris, and Connell all ran as 'Progressive' candidates, however Finlay, Morris, and Connell ran on a joint-ticket claiming to be 'popular Progressive' candidates, who the electors knew due to their past service. Thomson ran a separate campaign claiming to be 'The Progressive candidate,' focusing on the issue of temperance.
 Forsyth and Pringle ran as 'Workers' candidates, with a developed policy platform. This platform prioritised the establishment of a judicial rent commission to fix fair rents, and for the taxation of land values.
 Whilst running on a 're-elect' basis, Osborne is cited elsewhere as a member of the Glasgow Conservative party.

References

1896 Scottish local elections
1896
1890s in Glasgow